The John Ford Stock Company is the name given to the large collection of actors used repeatedly in the films of American director John Ford.  Most famous among these was John Wayne, who appeared in twenty-four films and three television episodes for the director.  Other members of the "stock company" include:

Jack Pennick – 41 films, 1 TV episode
Francis Ford (the director's brother) – 32 films
Harry Carey, Sr. – 27 films
John Wayne – 24 films, 3 TV episodes
Ward Bond – 24 films, 2 TV episodes
Harry Tenbrook – 26 films
J. Farrell MacDonald – 25 films
Vester Pegg – 23 films
Mae Marsh – 17 films, 1 TV episode
Frank Baker – 17 films
Duke Lee – 16 films
Joe Harris – 14 films
Danny Borzage – 13 films
Hoot Gibson – 13 films
Willis Bouchey – 9 films, 3 TV episodes
John Carradine – 11 films, 1 TV episode
Ken Curtis – 11 films, 1 TV episode
William Henry – 11 films, 1 TV episode
Victor McLaglen – 12 films
George O'Brien – 12 films
Molly Malone – 11 films
Harry Carey Jr. – 9 films, 1 TV episode
Sam Harris – 10 films
Robert Homans – 10 films
Cliff Lyons – 9 films, 1 TV episode
Robert Parrish – 10 films
Chuck Roberson – 9 films, 1 TV episode
Russell Simpson – 10 films
William Steele – 10 films
Patrick Wayne – 8 films, 2 TV episodes
Henry Fonda – 9 films
Ed Jones – 9 films
John Qualen – 9 films
Mickey Simpson – 9 films
Pat Somerset – 9 films
Hank Worden – 8 films, 1 TV episode
Anna Lee – 8 films, 1 TV episode
Ruth Clifford – 8 films
Mary Gordon – 8 films
James Flavin – 8 films
Ben Hall – 8 films
Chuck Hayward (as actor) – 7 films, 1 TV episode
Harry Strang – 8 films
Carleton Young – 6 films, 2 TV episodes
Brandon Hurst – 7 films
Fred Libby – 7 films
Jane Darwell – 7 films
Steve Pendleton – 7 films
Charles Seel – 5 films, 2 TV episodes
Charles Trowbridge – 7 films
Jack Woods – 7 films
Frank Albertson – 6 films
Mimi Doyle – 6 films
Earle Foxe – 6 films
Si Jenks – 6 films
Robert Lowery – 6 films
James A. Marcus – 6 films
Cyril McLaglen – 6 films
Paul McVey – 6 films
Jack Mower – 6 films
Lionel Pape – 6 films
Arthur Shields – 6 films
Charles Tannen – 6 films
Harry Tyler – 5 films, 1 TV episode
Tom Tyler – 6 films
Jack Walters – 6 films

Scores of actors appeared repeatedly for Ford up to five times.  Among the best known of these are:

Five appearances
Chief John Big Tree
Berton Churchill
Donald Crisp
Andy Devine
Stepin Fetchit
Shug Fisher
Barry Fitzgerald
Wallace Ford
Maureen O'Hara
Ben Johnson
Joe Sawyer
James Stewart
O.Z. Whitehead
Grant Withers

Four appearances
Edward Brophy
Charley Grapewin
Donald Meek
Vera Miles
Mildred Natwick
Woody Strode
Slim Summerville
Blue Washington

Three appearances
Pedro Armendáriz
Olive Carey
Dan Dailey
Paul Fix
Preston Foster
Jeffrey Hunter
George Irving
Mike Mazurki
Thomas Mitchell
Denver Pyle
Will Rogers
C. Aubrey Smith
Spencer Tracy
Richard Widmark

Membership in the John Ford Stock Company did not necessitate membership in Ford's social circle, and indeed many of the actors in the Stock Company never encountered Ford outside of work situations.

Crew
Ford had many long-standing relationships with members of his crew, and would often maintain longer and more prolific relationships with crew members than cast.

Screenwriters
 Frank S. Nugent
 George Hively
 Eugene B. Lewis 
 H. Tipton Steck 
 Charles J. Wilson Jr.
 Jules Furthman
 George C. Hull
 Dorothy Yost
 Charles Kenyon
 Frances Marion
 James Kevin McGuiness
 John Stone
 Dudley Nichols
 Spig Wead
 Lamar Trotti
 Nunnally Johnson
 Laurence Stallings
 James Warner Bellah

Producers
 Merian C. Cooper
 P.A. Powers 
 Sol Wurtzel
 Cliff Reid
 Darryl F. Zanuck
 Walter Wanger
 Lowell Farrell
 Michael Killanin
 Patrick Ford

Cinematographers
 Gregg Toland
 Ben Reynolds 
 John W. Brown 
 Harry C. Fowler
 George Schneiderman
 Joseph H. August
 Charles G. Clarke
 Arthur Miller
 Bert Glennon
 Archie Stout
 Winton C. Hoch

Editors
 Alex Troffey
 Frank E. Hull
 Paul Weatherwax
 George Hively
 Walter Thompson
 Robert Simpson
 Robert Parrish
 Jack Murray
 Barbara Ford
 Otho Lovering

Composers
 Max Steiner
 Samuel Kaylin
 Louis Silvers
 Alfred Newman
 Richard Hageman
 Victor Young
 Cyril J. Mockridge

Art Directors
 Van Nest Polglase
 William Darling
 Richard Day
 Mark Lee Kirk
 James Basevi
 Lyle R. Wheeler
 Frank Hotaling
 Martin Obzina
 Eddie Imazu

Set Decorators
 Thomas Little
 Julia Heron
 Joe Kish
 John McCarthy
 Darrell Silvera

Assistant Directors
 Edward O'Fearna
 Jack Pennick
 Wingate Smith

Second Unit Directors
 Cliff Lyons

Costume Designers
 Walter Plunkett

References

Lists of actors
Filmmaking collaborations